"All by Myself" is a song by American singer-songwriter Eric Carmen released in 1975. The verse is based on the second movement (Adagio sostenuto) of Sergei Rachmaninoff's circa 1900–1901 Piano Concerto No. 2 in C minor, Opus 18. The chorus was taken from the song "Let's Pretend", which Carmen wrote and recorded with the Raspberries in 1972. The slide guitar solo was performed by studio guitarist Hugh McCracken.

Background and composition 
According to Carmen, he first wrote the solo part of the song, writing four bars at a time, eventually completed the interlude after two months.  He needed to put this into a song, and after listening to Rachmaninoff's 2nd piano concerto, a piece famously used to underscore the 1945 British film Brief Encounter, he adapted the melody of its second movement to write the verse. Rachmaninoff's music was in the public domain in the United States at that time, so Carmen thought no copyright existed on it, but it was still protected outside the U.S. subsequent to the release of the album. He was later contacted by the Rachmaninoff estate and informed that it was protected. An agreement was reached in which the estate would receive 12 percent of the royalties from "All by Myself" as well as from "Never Gonna Fall in Love Again", which was based on the third movement from Rachmaninoff's Symphony No. 2.

Carmen has stated that he also incorporated part of another melody into this song. The melody of the chorus was taken from his previous hit with the Raspberries, "Let's Pretend".

Television performance
Carmen performed "All by Myself" and his follow-up hit, "Never Gonna Fall in Love Again," on The Midnight Special television program on July 23, 1976 (season 4, episode 37).  The show was hosted by The Spinners.

Chart position 
The power ballad was the first single from Carmen's first solo LP after leaving the power pop group the Raspberries and was released in December 1975. It reached number two on the Billboard Hot 100; both "Love Machine" by The Miracles and "December 1963 (Oh, What a Night)" by The Four Seasons, kept the song from number one. "All by Myself"  did reach number one on the Cash Box Top 100 Singles and number three in Canada. The single sold more than one million copies in the United States and was certified gold by the RIAA in April 1976. "All by Myself" was Carmen's first of eight US Top 40 hits. In the UK, however, this was his only Top 40 success, peaking at number 12.

Charts

Weekly charts

Year-end charts

Celine Dion version

The most notable cover version of "All by Myself" was recorded by Canadian singer Celine Dion in 1996. It was the fourth (or third, depending on the country) hit single from her fourth English-language studio album, Falling into You. Produced by David Foster at Compass Point Studios in The Bahamas, it was released on December 9, 1996, in the United Kingdom and on March 11, 1997, in the United States.

The single became one of Dion's biggest hits in the United States, reaching number one on the Hot Adult Contemporary Tracks (for three weeks) and the Latin Pop Airplay (two weeks). It peaked at number four on the Billboard Hot 100 (number seven on the Billboard Hot 100 Airplay and number five on the Hot 100 Singles Sales). It was also a top 10 hit in France, United Kingdom, Wallonia in Belgium and the Republic of Ireland. In Canada, "All by Myself" was released as a promotional single only, hitting number one on the Adult Contemporary Chart. "All by Myself" was certified gold in the US (500,000), and silver in the UK (200,000) and France (165,000).

During an interview on Watch What Happens Live with Andy Cohen, Dion revealed that the famous high note (F5) leading into the key change had not been planned but David Foster surprised her with it when she appeared for recording. When Dion asked why the surprise, Foster told her that if she couldn't sing it, other singers would, which prompted Dion to prove to Foster that she could sing it.

Critical reception
Dion's cover received positive reviews from most music critics. Bill Lamb from About.com placed it at number nine in their ranking of "Top 10 Celine Dion Songs". Entertainment Weekly editor Chuck Eddy said, "But only in her desolate cover of Eric Carmen's All by Myself does she truly crash through the glass ceiling of passion". Pip Ellwood-Hughes from Entertainment Focus called it "incredible" and "one of the best recorded vocals ever captured." He added that "listening to Dion reach the highs she does on that song is magical and it sends goosebumps down your spine look (sic) nothing else can." Dave Sholin from the Gavin Report commented, "Demand by both programmers and the public for this rendition of Eric Carmen's 1976 smash made it the obvious choice to be the third single lifted off Celine's multi-platinum and Grammy-nominated album, Falling into You".

A reviewer from Music Week rated it five out of five, stating that "Dion does a great job with the Eric Carmen power ballad and this one could be in for a long run given its guaranteed appeal to once-a-year record buyers. A contender for the top spot." The magazine's Alan Jones noted that "it's handled with consummate ease by Dion". Music.uk.launch.yahoo.com editor Dan Leroy wrote, "Trying to out-emote Eric Carmen was almost crazy enough to work". The New York Times editor Stephen Holden stated that the cover, along with "Because You Loved Me", "are the strongest cuts on an album crammed with formulaic romantic bombast". A reviewer from People Magazine said Dion "knocks herself out trying to match the classic bombast that Eric Carmen dished out on "All By Myself"." Geoff Edgers from Salon Magazine described it as a "dog-ear-shattering remake". Christopher Smith from TalkAboutPopMusic wrote,

Music video
A music video was produced to promote the single, directed by British director Nigel Dick. It contains fragments from Dion's photo session for the Falling into You album cover and some scenes from her Live à Paris concert. In between, there are also sepia toned footage showing an apparently lonely and sad Dion. The video was later published on Dion's official YouTube channel in August 2012. It has amassed more than 50 million views as of October 2021.

Track listings and formats

Australian CD and cassette single
"All by Myself" (Edited Single Version) – 3:58
"Because You Loved Me" (Live) – 4:52
"Next Plane Out" (Radio Edit) – 4:37
"Vole" (Live) – 4:03
"All by Myself" (Album Version) – 5:12

European CD and 7-inch single
"All by Myself" – 5:12
"The Power of the Dream" – 4:31

European CD maxi-single
"All by Myself" (Single Version) – 4:26
"All by Myself" – 5:12
"Je sais pas" (Live) – 4:26
"Pour que tu m'aimes encore" (Live) – 4:52

European 12-inch single
"All By Myself" – 5:12
"The Power of the Dream" – 4:31
"It's All Coming Back to Me Now" (Classic Paradise Radio Mix #1) – 4:22

Japanese CD single
"All by Myself" (Single Version) – 4:24
"Pour que tu m'aimes encore" (Live) – 4:51

Mexican promo CD single
"All by Myself" – 5:12
"Sola Otra Vez" – 5:12
"Sola Otra Vez" (Radio Edit) – 4:41

UK cassette single
"All by Myself" (Edited Single Version) – 3:58
"All by Myself" (Spanish Version) – 5:12
"When I Fall in Love" – 4:20

UK CD single
"All by Myself" (Album Version) – 5:12
"Pour que tu m'aimes encore" (Live) – 4:38
"Je sais pas" (Live) – 4:26
"River Deep, Mountain High" (Live) – 3:28

UK CD single (Limited)
"All by Myself" (Edited Single Version) – 3:58
"When I Fall in Love" – 4:20
"Declaration of Love" – 4:20
"A Message from Celine" – 0:34

US CD and cassette single
"All by Myself" (Edited Single Version) – 3:57
"Because You Loved Me" (Live) – 4:50

US promo CD single
"All by Myself" (Radio Edit #1) – 3:57
"All by Myself" (Album Version) – 5:12
"All by Myself" (Radio Edit #2) – 3:52

Charts

Weekly charts

Year-end charts

Certifications and sales

Release history

Other covers

In 1994, "All by Myself" was covered by New Zealand singer Margaret Urlich. Her version reached number 100 in Australia in November 1994, and number 26 in New Zealand in March 1995.

In 2018, a cover by Ghian Wright, renamed to "I'm All Alone (Belter Version)", was used in the science fiction television series The Expanse, in the episode of season 3 "Delta-V". The lyrics of the song were rewritten in the mix of English and Belter Creole, a constructed language made for the TV series by Nick Farmer, that was used in the show by Belters, the inhabitants of the asteroid belt and outer planets. The lyrics were additionally adjusted to fit the in-universe setting The full version of the song was later placed on The Collector's Edition version of the TV series soundtrack, that was realized on December 13, 2019.

See also

Billboard Year-End Hot 100 singles of 1976
Billboard Year-End Hot 100 singles of 1997
List of Billboard Hot 100 top 10 singles in 1997
List of number-one adult contemporary singles of 1997 (U.S.)
List of number-one Billboard Hot Latin Pop Airplay of 1997
List of UK top 10 singles in 1996
List of Cash Box Top 100 number-one singles of 1976

References

External links

1975 debut singles
1975 songs
1976 singles
1996 singles
1970s ballads
Arista Records singles
Cashbox number-one singles
Celine Dion songs
Columbia Records singles
Epic Records singles
Eric Carmen songs
Il Divo songs
Music videos directed by Nigel Dick
Pop ballads
Song recordings produced by David Foster
Song recordings produced by Jimmy Ienner
Songs about loneliness
Songs written by Eric Carmen
Popular songs based on classical music